Bursol is a rural locality (a settlement) in Slavgorod, Altai Krai, Russia. The population was 654 as of 2013. There are 9 streets.

References 

Rural localities in Slavgorod urban okrug